Rodney Austin (born December 4, 1988) is an American football offensive lineman who is currently a free agent. He was signed as an undrafted free agent by the Detroit Lions after the 2012 NFL Draft. He played college football at Elon University.

College career
He played college football at Elon University.

Professional career
He was signed by the Lions as an undrafted free agent in 2012. He was released on August 31, 2012 when the Lions established their final 53 roster but was signed to their practice squad the next day after he cleared waivers.

On April 21, 2015, Austin was released by the Detroit Lions.

on March 28, 2018, he was assigned to the Baltimore Brigade. On March 15, 2019, he was again assigned to the Brigade.

Personal life
Rodney is an avid flag football player in his post NFL Career. He has participated in and won a number of world championships across multiple formats and is one of the most highly touted players on the circuit.

References

External links
Detroit Lions bio
Elon Profile
ProfootballWeekly Profile

1988 births
Living people
American football offensive guards
Elon Phoenix football players
Detroit Lions players
Baltimore Brigade players
Players of American football from St. Louis